Palaeothunnus is an extinct genus of prehistoric tuna that lived during the Thanetian stage of the Paleocene epoch.

References

Prehistoric perciform genera
Paleocene fish of Asia